Avlakia is a settlement on the island of Othonoi, Greece. A fishing port is located in Avlakia.

References

Populated places in Corfu (regional unit)
Othonoi